"Instant Freeze" is the seventh episode of the Batman television series in its first season, originally airing on ABC February 2 and repeated on May 18, 1966.

Plot
Some time ago, during a fight between Batman and a criminal scientist called Doctor Schievel, the struggle only succeeded in overturning a large beaker of 'Instant Freeze' solution onto the villain. Now calling himself Mr. Freeze, Schievel is forced to live inside a super-cooled house designed to keep his body temperature at fifty degrees below zero, and only able to leave with the use of a special air-conditioned suit, Mr. Freeze decides to begin a rampage of revenge. He breaks into the Gotham City Diamond Exchange to steal some famous diamonds (otherwise known as 'ice'), but Batman and Robin, acting on a tip-off from Commissioner Gordon, arrive and attempt to stop him. However, Freeze's henchmen, Chill, Nippy and Mo, release five Batman and Mr. Freeze decoys, and in the resulting confusion the frozen felon makes his escape. Later, back at his hideout, Freeze makes plans to steal the Ghiaccio Circolo (Circle of Ice), Diamond from the visiting Princess Sandra of Molino.

Cliffhanger text

HAS BATMAN STRUCK OUT ?

IS ROBIN COOL, ...FOR GOOD ?

CAN NO ONE SAVE OUR NOBLE PAIR OF HUMAN POPSICLES ?

ANSWERS... TOMORROW NIGHT ! SAME TIME, SAME CHANNEL !

BUT ONE WORD OF WARNING:

BY WATCHING, YOU, TOO, CAN LOSE YOUR COOL !

External links
 

Batman (TV series) episodes
1966 American television episodes